France sent 33 athletes to the 1978 European Athletics Championships which took place 29 August–3 September 1978 in Prague. France won two medals at the Championships.

Medalists

References 

Nations at the 1978 European Athletics Championships
France at the European Athletics Championships
1978 in France